Colegio de San Benildo (CDSB), also known as San Benildo Integrated School - Cagayan de Oro Inc., was a  De La Salle supervised school in Opol, Misamis Oriental.

References

Universities and colleges in Misamis Oriental